The Human Tornado is a 1976 American blaxploitation film directed by Cliff Roquemore. The film is a sequel to Dolemite.

Plot
After coming off a successful comedy tour, Dolemite throws a get-together at his mansion. The party is crashed by racist police officers and they find out that the sheriff's wife is offering Dolemite money for sexual services. When the sheriff catches them red-handed, he shoots and kills his wife. Dolemite and his friends kidnap a young man and decide to head to California to meet Queen Bee. There, they find out that the local mob boss, Joe Cavaletti, has kidnapped two of Queen Bee's girls, forcing her to close her business and work for him. Dolemite rescues Queen Bee and her girls and teaches his enemies a lesson, all the while being chased by the sheriff, who has pinned the murder of his own wife on Dolemite.

Cast
 Rudy Ray Moore as Dolemite
 Lady Reed as "Queen Bee"
 Jimmy Lynch as Mr. Motion
 Howard Jackson as himself
 Gloria Delaney as Annie "Hurricane Annie"
 Jerry Jones as Pete
 Sir Lady Java as herself
 J.B. Baron as Sheriff Beatty
 Jack Kelly as Captain Ryan
 Herb Graham as Cavaletti
 Barbara Gerl as Mrs. Cavaletti
 James R. Page as Jimmy (credited as James Cromartie)
 Ernie Hudson as Bo (credited as Louis Hudson)
 Ed Montgomery as Dough

Release
Both the Daily Variety and BoxOffice announced Dimension Pictures’ acquisition of The Human Tornado which initially was set for release on June 23, 1976. The film officially premiered at the Rialto Theatre in Atlanta, GA, on July 23, 1976. The film was later shown across twenty theaters in Los Angeles and several theaters in New York City on October 13, 1976.

Critical reception
According to the American Film Institute, reviews of The Human Tornado focused on the film’s shortcomings, specifically editing and continuity. A review in The Hollywood Reporter praised certain performances by the actors Java, Herb Graham and Jerry Jones while a review in the Los Angeles Times found the film to be "dumber" than its predecessor as well as being much funnier.

Home media
The film was restored and released on DVD and Blu-ray by Vinegar Syndrome on May 31, 2016.

References

External links

1970s action comedy films
1970s exploitation films
1976 films
American action comedy films
Blaxploitation films
1976 comedy films
Dimension Pictures films
1970s English-language films
1970s American films